Kuntsevskaya may refer to:

Kuntsevskaya (Arbatsko-Pokrovskaya and Filyovskaya lines), a station of the Arbatsko-Pokrovskaya and Filyovskaya lines, Moscow Metro, Russia
Kuntsevskaya (Bolshaya Koltsevaya line), a station of the Bolshaya Koltsevaya line, Moscow Metro, Russia